The terminal sulcus is a groove in the right atrium of the heart. The terminal sulcus marks the separation of the right atrial pectinate muscles from the sinus venarum. The terminal sulcus extends from the front of the superior vena cava to the front of the inferior vena cava, and represents the line of union of the sinus venosus of the embryo with the primitive atrium. On the internal aspect of the right atrium, corresponding to the terminal sulcus is the crista terminalis.

The superior border of the terminal sulcus designates the transverse plane in which the SA node resides. The inferior border designates the transverse plane in which the AV node resides.

References

External links

Cardiac anatomy